Alexandra Ashley Hughes (born 31 July 1985), known by her stage name Allie X, is a Canadian singer, songwriter, and visual artist. She began her career as an indie pop artist in Toronto in the mid-2000s, playing with local bands and writing and recording a handful of self-released albums.

After relocating to Los Angeles, California, in 2013, Hughes began working with producers Cirkut and Billboard and achieved success with her first single released under the name Allie X, "Catch", which peaked at number 55 on the Canadian Hot 100 chart and was well received by music critics. The song rose to prominence after pop singer Katy Perry referred to it as her "spring jam" on social media.

Hughes released her debut extended play in 2015, CollXtion I, followed by her debut studio album CollXtion II in 2017, and Super Sunset in 2018. In 2019, she also released an analog version of Super Sunset. Her second studio album, Cape God, was released on 21 February 2020.

Early life
Alexandra Ashley Hughes was born on 31 July 1985 in Oakville, Ontario. Her family is of British descent. She attended the Etobicoke School of the Arts, then studied classical piano and voice at the Interlochen Arts Academy in Michigan, and graduated from Sheridan College's Musical Theatre Performance program, and also studied musical theatre.

Career

2006–2012: Career beginnings
Hughes first started her career under the stage name Allie Hughes in Toronto around 2006, performing indie pop, indie rock, jazz, and electronic music. She released the 10-track demo album, Waiting for the Prize in 2006, which she recorded while in college.

In 2008, she took part in CBC Television's How Do You Solve a Problem Like Maria?, the Canadian version based on the series with the same name which aired in the United Kingdom on BBC One in 2006. She performed "My Favourite Things" from The Sound of Music and "It's Oh So Quiet" by Björk but was eliminated from the show after two weeks. She released her second demo album that same year, titled Ladies and Gentlemen.

She recorded her debut studio album in 2009, collaborating with Dave Newfeld of Broken Social Scene, Leon Taheny, and Adam King of Run With Kittens. The album was titled The Hard Way and was initially set to be released in fall 2010 but  delayed to 2011 and ultimately scrapped. She released a 4-track self-titled extended play in 2010, meant to act as a preview for the then-upcoming project.

Following the cancellation of The Hard Way, Hughes developed her synth-pop and electronic inspired band, ALX, in late 2011. The group released their debut and only single, "I Will Love You More" in March 2012 and had their final known live performance at the Hillside Festival in July, where they performed seven unreleased original songs and one cover.

Her acting credits during this time include Canadian movies and television programmes, including The Boys in the Photograph, King, Being Erica, and Instant Star; her music was featured in Rookie Blue, Saving Hope, and Love Me.

2013–2015: CollXtion I
In July 2013, Hughes moved to Los Angeles to pursue a full-time career as a songwriter; despite this, she didn't stop working on her solo material. She hadn't been satisfied with her sound and spent time learning about sound design and production. She adopted the stage name Allie X and began working with producers Cirkut and Billboard, whom she had met during her time in Los Angeles.

In early 2014, Hughes released her debut single under the Allie X name, titled "Catch". Upon release, "Catch" received praise from multiple sources: DIY magazine's Jamie Milton said "Allie X stepped on the scene like a bottle of wine at a wedding – everyone wanted a piece of her," and Jamieson Cox from Time magazine said the track "shines with a level of polish and craft that's remarkable" and complemented Hughes's attention to detail. American singer-songwriter Katy Perry also praised the track on Twitter, calling it her "spring jam". "Catch" charted on the Canadian Hot 100, peaking at number 55 on the chart. "Catch" went on to be re-released as an EP in November 2015, featuring additional tracks.

Prior to the release of Hughes's debut extended play, CollXtion I, two singles, "Prime" and "Bitch", were put out by the singer on 18 March and 6 April 2014, respectively. CollXtion I was then released a year later, on 7 April 2015 in Canada, with the worldwide release being pushed back to 21 April. The EP was well received, with Edmonton Journals Julia LeConte calling it "a smartly written seven-song EP that offers up a smorgasboard of indelible hooks" and goes on to say Hughes's song-creating ability matches her "spectacular" voice. She held a small North American tour in 2015.

Besides working on solo music, in 2014 and 2015, Hughes also contributed to Australian singer Troye Sivan's album Blue Neighbourhood, co-writing seven tracks, including two of the album's three singles, "Talk Me Down" and "Youth". She also supported Troye Sivan on his 2016 tour's North American leg.

Hughes was one of four musicians to receive the Canadian Film Centre Slaight Music Residency Showcase in 2013.

2016–2018: CollXtion II and Super Sunset
Despite having released albums and EPs in the past, Hughes had yet to release a studio album under the Allie X name. In February 2016, Hughes released a free-to-download song called "Old Habits Die Hard", which was originally meant to serve as a non-album single. On 13 May 2016, Hughes released another song called "Too Much to Dream" and announced a project called CollXtion II: Ʉnsolved, which saw her release a collection of demos and songs on Spotify over the course of the summer, in order to shortlist the songs her fans wanted to see on CollXtion II. This project ended on 6 November 2016, with Hughes saying no new music would be released until the album is out.

CollXtion II began to be teased by Hughes in February 2017, with it being officially announced for a 9 June release date on 23 February. On 28 April 2017, Hughes released "Paper Love" as the first single from the upcoming album. "Need You" was released on 26 May 2017.

On 1 June 2018, Hughes released "Focus" as the first single from her then-untitled second studio album, followed by the release of the second single "Not so Bad in LA" on 13 July. The following Monday, Hughes announced her extended play, Super Sunset, to be released in the upcoming fall, along with a four date promotional tour, The Super Sunset Xperience. On 25 December 2018, Hughes released Super Sunset Analog, an alternate version of her previously released album Super Sunset.

2019–present: Cape God 
On 26 September 2019, Hughes released "Fresh Laundry" along with a music video for her next album that was then untitled. This was followed by "Rings a Bell" on 17 October. On 8 November, the third single, "Regulars", was released. The fourth single, a collaboration with singer-songwriter Troye Sivan, "Love Me Wrong", was released on 6 December. On 16 December, Allie announced the pre-order, album artwork, and album title for her upcoming album, Cape God, through her social media accounts. A fifth single, "Devil I Know", was released on 31 January 2020. The album was released 21 February 2020. Hughes' vocals were featured on "Shadow" by Dutch electronic music duo Vicetone, released on Canadian label Monstercat on 30 October 2020. The singer also released a collab with Mitski, "Susie Save Your Love". In 2020, she appeared as a guest host in the seventh episode of Canada's Drag Race.

She performed in the 2021 virtual edition of Pride Toronto.

In July 2021, Hughes released a single with drag queen Violet Chachki, "Mistress Violet", produced by French producer Lecomte De Brégeot and written by Hughes. The song's 1980s influenced music video was shot in analog and features Hughes and Chachki in Schiaparelli haute couture outfits. Chachki had previously appeared with Hughes in the music video for her 2016 single "All the Rage".

Artistry
Hughes cites many of her influences as being ABBA, Arthur Russell, Björk, Kate Bush, Lady Gaga, Céline Dion, Cyndi Lauper, Mariah Carey, Mark Mothersbaugh, Tom Petty, and author Haruki Murakami. She also explains that the X in her name represents the unknown variable in algebra, saying: "In mathematics, X is any possible variable. It's an unknown quantity. Once it's solved, it's no longer X. With that in mind, X is the identity that I take on as I go through my journey of self-discovery. It's these questions that I'm trying to grapple with in the public sphere. If I ever find that piece that I'm after or solve the equation, as it were, then I will no longer be Allie X."

Hughes has the vocal range of a soprano, with her music having drawn frequent comparisons to British singer Ellie Goulding's, but also that of Chvrches and The Knife. Hughes describes her melodies as being "soaring pop, borderline theatrical Disney", while her lyrics, "always seem to be darker." She compares songwriting to a science experiment in which you put two people's brains together for a few hours and see what they can come up with.

Public advocacy
Hughes has frequently voiced her support for women's rights and LGBT rights, noting "I have a lot of young fans, and a lot of LGBT fans. After meeting and hugging so many of them, I often picture them when I write now, and I try to send my support".

Awards and nominations
{| class=wikitable
|-
! Year !! Awards !! Work !! Category !! Result !! Ref. 
|-
| 2015
| Berlin Music Video Awards
| "Catch"
| Best Art Direction
| 
|
|-
| 2017
| APRA Music Awards
| "Youth"
| Pop Work of the Year
| 
|

Discography

Allie X has released two studio albums: CollXtion II in 2017 and Cape God in 2020. She has released five EPs, including CollXtion I (2015) and Super Sunset (2018). She co-wrote several songs on each of Troye Sivan's first two albums, Blue Neighbourhood and Bloom, and has written songs for other artists including BTS, Seohyun, Lea Michele, and Betty Who.

Tours

Headlining
Doing X Tour (2015)
The Collxtion II Tour (2017)
The Super Sunset Xperience (2018)
Cape God Tour (2022)

Supporting
Blue Neighbourhood Tour (with Troye Sivan) (2016)
Expectations Tour (with Hayley Kiyoko) (2018)
Remember the Future Tour (with ionnalee) (2019)
Love + Tour Part 2 (with Marina) (2019)
Charli Live Tour (with Charli XCX) (2019)

References

External links

 
 

 
Living people
1985 births
Avant-pop musicians
Avant-garde singers
Canadian women pop singers
Canadian women singer-songwriters
Canadian singer-songwriters
Canadian indie pop musicians
Canadian television actresses
Canadian people of British descent
Electropop musicians
Canadian LGBT rights activists
People from Oakville, Ontario
Synth-pop singers
21st-century Canadian women singers
Canadian women in electronic music
Canadian expatriates in the United States
Musicians from Ontario